Póvoa de Santa Iria e Forte da Casa is a civil parish in the municipality of Vila Franca de Xira, Portugal. It was formed in 2013 by the merger of the former parishes Póvoa de Santa Iria and Forte da Casa. The population in 2021 was 40,905, in an area of 9.16 km².

See also 

 Póvoa de Santa Iria
 Forte da Casa

References

Freguesias of Vila Franca de Xira

External links 

 Junta de Freguesia Póvoa de Santa Iria e Forte da Casa (in Portuguese)